I Thought the Future Would Be Cooler is the sixth album by Portland, Oregon-based musical group Yacht, released on October 16, 2015.

Track listing

References

External links

2015 albums
Yacht (band) albums
Downtown Records albums